Glenn Dawson Wheatley (23 January 1948 – 1 February 2022) was an Australian musician, talent manager and  tour promoter.

Career

Wheatley began his career as a musician in Brisbane in the mid-1960s. In the late 1960s he became known nationally as the bass player in the rock band the Masters Apprentices. He subsequently formed a media empire which included radio stations and artist management. 

Wheatley is best known as the long time manager of John Farnham, he has been described as an "iconic industry figure" and is credited with launching the career of Delta Goodrem. He is also recognised as having established Little River Band in the United States.

Musician

Bay City Union 
Wheatley's first significant foray into music was as a guitarist in the Brisbane blues band Bay City Union. The band was fronted by singer Matt Taylor who later achieved fame in Australia as lead singer of pioneering blues band Chain.

The Masters Apprentices 
In early 1968, Wheatley was hired as the bass player in a new line-up of the Melbourne-based pop-rock band the Masters Apprentices, then one of Australia's most popular groups. Wheatley's four-year tenure with the group, which lasted until shortly before their break-up in 1972, included the recording of many of their most successful songs, including the hit singles "Turn Up Your Radio" (1970) and "Because I Love You" (1971) as well as the 1971 album Choice Cuts which was recorded at Abbey Road Studios in London.

It was during Wheatley's tenure in the Masters that he learned at first hand about the highly exploitative nature of the Australian pop industry at that time. The band endured many "rip-offs" and in their later career they suffered greatly from poor management decisions and inadequate support from their record labels, problems which eventually led to the group's demise in 1972.

According to Wheatley's memoir, a key incident took place in late 1969 when the Masters took part in a nationwide package tour, "Operation Starlift". The concert at Brisbane Festival Hall drew a then record crowd of over 7,000 people, breaking the venue's previous attendance record set during the Beatles' Australian tour in 1964.

After the concert Wheatley reflected on the event and it became a turning point in his life and career because it finally drove home just how badly the group were being exploited. Wheatley knew that patrons had paid $5 per ticket, so the receipts for the night would have been around $35,000, but the Masters Apprentices, like all the other acts, were on a fixed fee and received a mere $200 for the show; even the top-billed act, John Farnham, probably only earned about $1,000. Figuring that the performers were probably only paid about $2,000 in total, Wheatley realised that the promoters had walked away with upwards of $30,000 for that concert alone.

Talent manager

Little River Band 
In late 1974, Beeb Birtles, Graham Goble and Derek Pellicci (ex-Mississippi) and Glenn Shorrock  (ex-Axiom) met with Wheatley in London. With Wheatley as manager, they agreed to reconvene in Melbourne in early 1975. They decided their new band would establish itself in the United States. Wheatley's first-hand experiences of the rip-offs in the 1960s music scene, combined with working in music management in the UK and the US in the early 1970s, allowed him to help Little River Band become the first Australian group to enjoy consistent commercial and chart success in the US.

In May 1975, Little River Band signed with EMI Records and started recording their debut self-titled album at Armstrong Studios the following month. The album was co-produced by Wheatley.

Wheatley travelled to Los Angeles in December 1975 and touted the group to various record companies until Rupert Perry of Capitol Records signed them on Christmas Eve.

Under Wheatley's management, the band sold more than 30 million records; six studio albums reached the top 10 on the Australian albums chart and ten singles reached the top 20 on the Billboard Hot 100.

John Farnham 

After Little River Band were dropped by Capitol Records in 1986, Wheatley returned to Australia and began taking over management, from Kenn Brodziak, of his friend John Farnham who had been a leading pop singer in the late 1960s and early 1970s but his career had been reduced to playing club gigs before he replaced Glenn Shorrock in 1982 as the lead singer of Little River Band. Wheatley mortgaged his own house to help pay for the recording of Farnham's 1986 comeback album, Whispering Jack. The gamble paid off and re-established Farnham as a major singing star. The album became (and remains) the biggest-selling Australian album of all time by a local artist. Wheatley went on to manage Farnham's career, including tours and records. They remained close friends until Wheatley's death.

Later years 

In 1999, Wheatley published his autobiography, Paper Paradise, which was based in part on a ribald memoir he had begun during his stint in the Masters entitled Who The Hell Is Judy in Sydney?.

Wheatley also managed Australian Neighbours actress and singer Delta Goodrem, helping her to achieve major success, but Goodrem split with Wheatley under acrimonious circumstances in 2003.

Radio assets

In 1980, Wheatley led a consortium that founded EON-FM in Melbourne, the first commercial FM radio station in Australia. It was sold to Triple M in 1985. Wheatley bought EON-FM again in 1986 before selling it to Hoyts. In 2013, EON Broadcasters, in which Wheatley held a 10% shareholding, purchased 91.9 Sea FM and 92.7 Mix FM on the Sunshine Coast from Southern Cross Austereo. In 2017, EON Broadcasters purchased 2CH in Sydney from Macquarie Radio, selling it in 2020 to Sports Entertainment Network.

Criminal convictions
In July 2007, Wheatley pleaded guilty to charges of tax evasion and faced the possibility of up to 16 years in jail. On 19 July 2007, he was sentenced in the County Court to 30 months jail, with a minimum of 15 months to be served. In order to reduce his sentence he informed on his lawyer "to save his own skin".

"I'm ashamed of what I have done", Wheatley said in court. "It was something that I have regretted for a long, long time and I'm ashamed of what I've brought on my family, who have had to suffer a lot."

During the trial, many high-profile Australians presented character references for Wheatley, including John Farnham, Sydney Swans' chairman Richard Colless and entertainer Bert Newton. One reference, from army general Peter Cosgrove, described Wheatley as a "very honest and upright person".

However, Commonwealth prosecutor Richard Maidment SC said that "The fraud that was instigated (by Wheatley) can be described as sustained and sophisticated. Tax fraud is not to be seen as a victimless crime." Wheatley was released from Beechworth Correctional Centre on 19 May 2008 and was moved to home detention with electronic surveillance for the remainder of his sentence. Wheatley completed his detention on 18 October 2008 and immediately left for an overseas holiday.

On 14 May 2010, Wheatley was charged with drink driving after recording a blood alcohol level of 0.08 by a random breath testing unit in Rushcutters Bay. He faced Waverley Court on 9 June 2010 and pleaded guilty. His licence was suspended for six months and he received an $850 fine.

Personal life and death
Wheatley was married to the actress Gaynor Martin and they had one son and two daughters.

He shifted base between Sydney and Melbourne over the years. In June 2012, while walking his son's dog, Danko, he had part of his middle finger chewed off trying to intervene when another dog attacked.

Wheatley died from complications of COVID-19 on 1 February 2022, at the age of 74.

Awards and nominations

Go-Set Pop Poll
The Go-Set Pop Poll was co-ordinated by teen-oriented pop music newspaper Go-Set. It was established in February 1966 and conducted an annual poll from 1966 to 1972 of its readers to determine the most popular personalities.

|-
|  1970
|  himself 
| Best Guitarist
| 5th
|-
| 1971
| himself 
| Best Bass Guitarist
| style="background:gold;"| 1st
|-

Further reading 
 Forbes, Clark. Whispering Jack: The John Farnham Story. (1989) 
 Keays, Jim. His Master's Voice. (Allen & Unwin, 1999) 
 Wheatley, Glenn. Paper Paradise: Confessions of a Rock 'n' Roll Survivor. (Bantam Books, 1999) 
 Wheatley, Glenn. Facing the Music (Hardie Grant Books, 2010)

References

External links
 
 

1948 births
2022 deaths
Australian bass guitarists
Australian autobiographers
Australian fraudsters
Deaths from the COVID-19 pandemic in Australia
Little River Band
People convicted of fraud
Talent managers
The Masters Apprentices members